Bardin may refer to;

Bardin, Florida American city
Bardin (surname)

See also
Brandeis-Bardin Institute American college